A  or  is a Chinese lidded bowl without a handle, used for the infusion of tea leaves and the consumption of tea. It was invented during the Ming dynasty. It consists of a bowl, a lid, and a saucer.

History
Prior to the Ming dynasty (1368–1644), tea was normally consumed from the vessel in which it was prepared. As described by the tea master Lu Yu, this special bowl had to be large enough to accommodate the implements and actions of tea brewing, though compact enough to be held comfortably in the hands for consumption. 'tea bowl'). It was during the Ming dynasty that the innovations in both tea ritual and tea preparation gave rise to the gaiwan.

Design

Gaiwans are made up of three parts: a saucer, a bowl, and a lid.  They can be made from a variety of materials, including porcelain and glass. Gaiwans made from Yixing clay or jade are particularly prized by collectors of tea paraphernalia.  They are typically small, with a volume of around 100-150 ml.

A recently excavated Ming princely burial has yielded the first example to survive until modern times of a type of gaiwan set known from 15th-century paintings.  There is a blue and white Jingdezhen porcelain stem cup, that has a silver stand and a gold cover (this dated 1437), all decorated with dragons.  Presumably many such sets existed, but recycling the precious metal elements was too tempting at some point, leaving only the porcelain cups.

Functions

The gaiwan is considered to be particularly good for brewing teas with delicate flavors and aromas, such as green tea and white tea. The versatility of the gaiwan is also noted in the preparation of oolong infusions because of this particular tea's ability to be infused multiple times, but the gaiwan is suitable for any type of tea. The gaiwan is important in tea tasting due to its open and glazed surfaces: the former allows the tea to be viewed while brewing, and the latter prevents altering of the flavour and aroma of the tea during brewing. The lid of the gaiwan allows the tea to be infused right in the bowl and either be drunk right from the bowl (traditionally using the lid to block the leaves for ease of consumption), or decanted into another container.

Gaiwan is the preferred method for brewing green and white teas as the gaiwan's porcelain absorbs the heat and does not damage the tea. Gaiwans are less suitable for black teas as the large lid allows heat to escape too quickly during the steeping process. They are especially common in the north of China for enjoying scented teas like jasmine tea.

Use
Usually all three parts are held at once with both hands. The saucer is held with the fingers of the right hand while the thumb rests on the edge of the bowl. The left hand then holds the lid, which is used to brush away the tea leaves before drinking. It can take some practice to do this, as the liquid is hot.

See also
 Chinese tea
 Chawan

References

Teaware
Chinese porcelain
Chinese words and phrases
Pottery shapes